The Scout was one of the named passenger trains of the Atchison, Topeka and Santa Fe Railway. It started as train Nos. 1 (westbound) & 10 (eastbound) between Chicago, Illinois and Los Angeles, California. Inaugurated on January 16, 1916, this "budget" heavyweight train had tourist sleeping cars with upper and lower berths, "chair" cars (coaches) and an open-end observation car.

The train was assigned Nos. 1 & 2 in 1920 and reverted to Nos. 1 & 10 a year later. In summer 1926 it left Chicago at 1115 and arrived Los Angeles at 0900 three days later, running via Ottawa Jct, Amarillo and Fullerton. In November 1939 it left at 2045 and arrived 0700, sixty hours on the same route except via Pasadena.

History

Timeline
 January 19, 1916:  The Scout commences operation.
 1920:  The eastbound Scout is assigned No. 2, but becomes No. 10 the following year.
 January 4, 1931: The Scout is discontinued during the Great Depression. Thereafter, economy service was provided by the Hopi, the Missionary, and the Navajo.
 May 10, 1936: The "new" (renovated) Scout resumes.  The westbound trip was completed in 60 hours, 15 minutes, while the eastbound schedule was reduced to 58 hours, 35 minutes.
 June 1954:  The Scout is withdrawn as passengers prefer to use Santa Fe's streamlined trains.

Major stations
Major stations on the main itinerary to Los Angeles Union Station:
Chicago, Illinois
Kansas City, Missouri
Wichita, Kansas
Amarillo, Texas
Clovis, New Mexico, point from which sections diverted to Carlsbad Caverns 
Belen, New Mexico, a short distance south of Albuquerque
Williams, Arizona, transfer point for bus connection to Grand Canyon
San Bernardino, California
Pasadena
Los Angeles

Oakland section major stations
West of Barstow, in eastern California, a second section departed northwest to the California Central Valley and Oakland:
Bakersfield
Fresno
Merced
Stockton
Richmond
Berkeley
Oakland

See also
 Passenger train service on the Atchison, Topeka and Santa Fe Railway

References

External links

California State Railway Museum
Santa Fe Railway Historical & Modeling Society
Santa Fe Railway 1937 timetable
Santa Fe Railway 1953 timetable
Brochure and illustrations of the 'Scout'
Dinner menu, 1940

Passenger trains of the Atchison, Topeka and Santa Fe Railway
Named passenger trains of the United States
Railway services introduced in 1916
Night trains of the United States
Railway services discontinued in 1954